The Musée des Matériaux du Centre de Recherche sur les Monuments Historiques was a museum in the Palais de Chaillot at 9, avenue Albert de Mun, Paris, France, that displayed building materials used in historical monuments along with scale models of buildings. According to Museums of the World: Handbook of International Documentation and Information and the International directory of arts, it no longer exists.

See also 
 List of museums in Paris
 Cité de l'Architecture et du Patrimoine

References 
 Paris.org entry
 ParisInfo entry
 Michael Zils, Museums of the World: Handbook of International Documentation and Information, K. G. Saur Verlag GmbH & Company. .
 Walter Kaupert, International directory of arts, K. G. Saur Verlag GmbH & Company, 2004. .

Defunct museums in Paris